The Ministry of Home Affairs ( or Kemendagri) is a ministry of the Government of Indonesia responsible for internal matters of the state. The ministry was formerly known as the Department of Home Affairs (abbreviated as Depdagri) until 2010 when the nomenclature of the Department of Home Affairs was changed to the Ministry of Home Affairs in accordance with the Regulation of the Minister of Home Affairs Number 3 of 2010 on the Nomenclature of the Ministry of Home Affairs. It is headed by the Minister of Home Affairs. Starting 23 October 2019, Tito Karnavian held this office.

History

Its main function was to oversee police force, transmigration, and agrarian matters. It existed until 1942, the year of the Japanese invasion. During the Japanese occupation (1942-1945) the name was changed to Naimubu. Its function was expanded to oversee religious, social, health, education, pedagogic, and cultural matters. Naimubu maintained its operations from its office at Jalan Sagara no. 7 Djakarta until 1945.
On 19 August 1945 Naimubu was split into several departments:
Department of Home Affairs; at the time, still overseeing religious matters; Religious matters would eventually be handed over to the newly established Department of Religious Affairs 
Department of Social Affairs 
Department of Health
Department of Education, Teaching, and Culture

The Department of Home Affairs was the first government department established under the Presidential Cabinet of Indonesia following independence. Due to changes of political situation and the constitution, the department was renamed several times. The nomenclature "" (Department of Home Affairs) was changed to "" (Ministry of Home Affairs) in 2010.

Responsibilities
The main responsibilities of the ministry are the formulation, determination and implementation of policies related to political and general governance; regional autonomy; development of regional and village administration and matters of governance; regional development and finance as well as demographics and civil records. it also reviews laws passed by provincial legislatures. The home affairs minister officially inaugurates elected provincial governors on behalf of the president.

If both the president and the vice president are unable to carry out their duties, Article 8 of the Constitution states that they are replaced by a three-person team comprising the minister of foreign affairs, minister of home affairs and minister of defence pending the selection of a president and vice-President by the People's Consultative Assembly within thirty days.

Organization
Based on Article 4 of Presidential Regulation No. 11/2015 on the Ministry of Home Affairs, as well as Home Minister Regulation No. 13/2021 on the Organization and Administration of the Ministry of Home Affairs, the ministry is organized into the following:

Executive 

 Minister of Home Affairs, who heads the entire ministry and is a member of the cabinet.
 Deputy Minister of Home Affairs, who assists the Minister in performance of his duties

Directorates General 

 Directorate General of Politics and General Governance is tasked with policy drafting and execution concerning politics and general governance. It is subdivided into several units, as follow:
 DG Secretariat 
 Directorate of National Ideology, Character, and Vision
 Directorate of Internal Politics
 Directorate of Economic, Social, and Cultural Resilience
 Directorate of Civil Organization
 Directorate of National Vigilance
 Directorate General of Territorial Administration is tasked with policy drafting and execution concerning territorial administration. It is subdivided into several units, as follow:
 DG Secretariat
 Directorate of Deconsentration, Coadministration, and Cooperation
 Directorate of Territory, Urban Affairs, and State Border
 Directorate of Municipal Police and Public Safety
 Directorate of Toponym and Regional Border
 Directorate of Disaster and Fire Management
 Directorate General of Regional Autonomy is tasked with policy drafting and execution concerning regional autonomy. It is subdivided into several units, as follow:
 DG Secretariat
 Directorate of Regional Arrangement, Special Autonomy, and Regional Autonomy Advisory Council
 Directorate of Regional Executive and Legislature Facilitation
 Directorate of Regional Legislation
 Directorate of Regional Performance Evaluation and Capacity Building
 Directorate General of Regional Development is tasked with policy drafting and execution concerning regional development. It is subdivided into several units, as follow:
 DG Secretariat
 Directorate of Regional Development Planning, Evaluation, and Information
 Directorate of Regional Governance Synchronization I, concerning regional government's land use and spatial planning, energy and mineral resources, agriculture and food, forestry, and environmental affairs
 Directorate of Regional Governance Synchronization II, concerning regional government's public works, housing and settlements, marine affairs and fisheries, transportation, communication and information, statistics, and ciphers
 Directorate of Regional Governance Synchronization III, concerning regional government's public health, sociocultural affairs, cooperatives and SMEs, investment, industries, trade, tourism, village empowerment, and home administration   
 Directorate of Regional Governance Synchronization IV, concerning regional government's education, labor, transmigration, women and child affairs, population control and planned family affairs, youth, sports, libraries, and archives.
 Directorate General of Villages Governance is tasked with policy drafting and execution concerning governance of villages. It is subdivided into several units, as follow:
 DG Secretariat
 Directorate of Village Governance Planning and Administration
 Directorate of Village Bureaucracy Facilitation and Capacity Building
 Directorate of Village Finance and Assets Facilitation
 Directorate of Village Institutions and Cooperation
 Directorate of Village Development Evaluation
 Directorate General of Regional Finance is tasked with policy drafting and execution concerning regional finances. It is subdivided into several units, as follow:
 Directorate of Regional Budget Planning
 Directorate of Regional Budget Realization and Accountability
 Directorate of Regional Income
 Directorate of Regional Balancing Fund and Loans
 Directorate of Region-Owned Enterprise, Public Service, and Property
 Directorate General of Population and Civil Registration is tasked with policy drafting and execution concerning population and civil registration. It is subdivided into several units, as follow:
 DG Secretariat
 Directorate of Population Documentation
 Directorate of Civil Registration
 Directorate of Population Administration Information Management
 Directorate of Population and Civil Registration Apparatus
 Directorate of Population Data and Document Utilization

Secretariat 
Secretariat General is headed by a Secretary General, tasked with providing administrative support for all units within the ministry.

Inspectorate 
Inspectorate General is headed by an Inspector General, tasked with internal supervision over all units within the ministry.

 IG Secretariat
 Inspectorate I
 Inspectorate II
 Inspectorate III
 Inspectorate IV
 Special Inspectorate, authorized to conduct special inspection, public complaints response, inspection prior to administrative sanctions, as well as other coordinative duties.

Agencies 

 Research and Development Agency
 Human Resource Development Agency

Advisory Staffs 

 Advisor to the Minister on Law and National Unity
 Advisor to the Minister on Governance
 Advisor to the Minister on Social and Interinstitutional Relations
 Advisor to the Minister on Economic and Development Affairs
 Advisor to the Minister on Apparatus and Public Service 

Logo gallery

See also
 Municipal Police (Indonesia)

References

Literature

Government ministries of Indonesia
Indonesia